Minotaur, the Wild Beast of Crete is a 1960 film based on the Greek legend of Theseus, the Athenian hero who is said to have slain a minotaur on Minoan Crete around 1500 or 1450 BC. The film was directed by Silvio Amadio and starred Bob Mathias.

Plot
The island of Crete lives in fear of the Minotaur, a dreadful beast trapped inside a labyrinth under the royal palace. The monster is venerated as a god, and to appease it, the Cretians regularly sacrifice a maiden to it.

One day, Minos' wife Pasiphaë is dying of natural causes. On her deathbed, she reveals that her daughter, the royal princess Phaedra, was not their only child: A twin sister, Ariadne, lives in secrecy on the Greek mainland in a humble village. She was brought there to avoid being sacrificed to the Minotaur, but now the queen's last wish is to see her daughters united again. While Minos consents to his wife's last request, Phaedra, who is a power-hungry and evil schemer, refuses to share the throne and sends out her loyal retainer, Chirone, to kill Ariadne. Chirone raids the village with a group of hired brigands, killing everyone including Ariadne's foster parents, but Ariadne is rescued by Theseus, son of King Aegeus of Athens, and his Cretan friend Demetrios, who happen to pass by. Upon seeing her, Demetrios immediately notices Ariadne's striking resemblance to Princess Phaedra, but Ariadne knows nothing of her true heritage.

Theseus and Ariadne accompany Demetrios back to Crete, but Chirone returns before them, alerting Phaedra to their arrival. Phaedra has her soldiers go after the friends; Ariadne is captured, Demetrios killed, and Theseus is almost slain as well. Rescued by the sea goddess Amphitrite, but refusing her offer to stay with her and become immortal, Theseus returns secretly to Knossos to free Ariadne. Phaedra has meanwhile prepared to dispose of her sister by throwing her into a pit with hungry hyenas, but as Theseus attacks, Phaedra herself ends up in the pit, and to save Theseus, Ariadne is forced to take her sister's place. But Chirone notices that his princess has suddenly changed in her demeanor and reveals his knowledge to Ariadne, but promises to keep her secret as long as she surrenders herself to him.

In the meantime, however, Aegeus, presuming his son to have been murdered, has led a war against Crete and lost. As a tribute, the people of Athens must now surrender a group of young people in regular intervals as sacrifices to the Minotaur. As the first group, which is joined by Theseus, is about to be herded into the labyrinth, Theseus manages to procure a sword and voluntarily enters the labyrinth and slays the Minotaur. Upon Theseus' brave decision, a riot breaks out and Chirone is killed by the mob. Ariadne, who has followed Theseus, helps him out with a thread from her own gown whose other end she had tied to the labyrinth's entrance, and they return alive and to the jubilation of the Cretan people.

Cast
 Bob Mathias as "Theseus"
 Rosanna Schiaffino as "Ariadne"/"Phaedra"
 Alberto Lupo as "Chirone"
 Rik Battaglia as "Demetrios"
 Carlo Tamberlani as " King Minos"
 Nico Pepe as "Gerione"
 Nerio Bernardi as "King Aegeus"
 Paul Müller as "Medico di Corte"
 Tina Lattanzi as "Queen Pasiphaë"
 Milo Malagoli as "The Minotaur"

Release

Minotaur, the Wild Beast of Crete was released in Italy on 25 November 1960. It was released in the United States in April 1961. The film was released on home video by Something Weird Video.

Reception

Author and film critic Leonard Maltin awarded the film one and a half out of four stars. In his review on the film, Maltin wrote, "Occasional atmosphere and Schiaffino's appearance still cannot salvage [the] story".

See also
 list of historical drama films
 List of films based on Greco-Roman mythology
 Greek mythology in popular culture

References

Footnotes

Sources

External links
 

1960 films
1960s fantasy films
Italian fantasy films
Peplum films
Films set in ancient Greece
Films set in Crete
Films based on classical mythology
Films scored by Carlo Rustichelli
United Artists films
Cultural depictions of Theseus
Sword and sandal films
Phaedra
Minotaur
1960s Italian films